The Battle of Gris-Nez and Blanc-Nez (18 July 1805) was a naval engagement between a combined Batavian-French flotilla under Carel Hendrik Ver Huell and a larger British squadron under Lord Keith during the War of the Third Coalition of the Napoleonic Wars (1803–1815). The Batavian-French flotilla was able to repulse the British fleet and successfully reached Boulogne-sur-Mer.

Prelude

The Batavian Navy was supposed to take part in the planned invasion of the United Kingdom. To this end a large flotilla of flat-bottomed boats was built in the Batavian Republic, that had to be transported over sea to Boulogne, where the main invasion jump-off point was located. Carel Hendrik Ver Huell was selected to lead this dangerous mission as a vice-admiral. In 1804, Ver Huell already had successfully brought a large Batavian flotilla from Vlissingen to Dunkirk. A fleet of the Royal Navy under Sir William Sidney Smith had tried to prevent this near Ostend, but a combination of excellent seamanship and French artillery from the shore caused Smith to retreat. Napoleon was impressed and wrote to Ver Huell: "You reminded me, that you are of the blood of the Tromps and De Ruyters." The feat earned Ver Huell the membership of the Légion d'honneur as the first non-Frenchman, and caused the Batavian government to make him vice-admiral and minister of the navy.
He also was appointed commander of the right wing of the Flottille de Boulogne, which formed an important part of the larger fleet that was supposed to invade Britain.

First, however, he received orders to sail his squadron from Dunkirk to Ambleteuse, a port not far from Boulogne. Ver Huell set sail on 17 July 1805 with 4 French prams and 32 Batavian gunboats. A British squadron, consisting of 15 warships, which was cruising nearby attacked. After a fierce struggle, the Batavian flotilla, again supported by French artillery on shore, repulsed the British attack and around 11:00 they were forced to retreat. The battle however also forced Ver Huell and his flotilla to anchor in the port of Calais. Batavian vessels, which had remained at Dunkirk, now joined the rest of the fleet without danger. In the morning of the next day however Ver Huell's flotilla was again attacked by 19 British ships, including two ships of the line, some frigates, corvettes and bomb galiots, but the British had to retire quickly. Ver Huell was however forced to leave several vessels behind for repairs.

Battle

On 18 July at 15:00, Ver Huell's flottila now just 21 gunboats, 3 prams and 180 artillery pieces strong, finally set sail from Calais. Also accompanying the flotilla as an observer was Louis Nicolas Davout, who had joined while the fleet was in Calais. Ver Huell aboard the Heemskerk and his flotilla, came into contact with the British fleet, consisting of 45 warships with 900 pieces of artillery, in between the capes of Cap Blanc-Nez and Cap Gris Nez around 17:00. Exactly at the moment Ver Huell sailed around Blanc-Nez, at a point where the depth of the coast made it impossible for the French land batteries to support the his ships.

The British fleet, which had been on the lookout for the Batavians, was much stronger than Ver Huell's squadron, which had fewer guns and fewer vessels at its disposal. The British opened a murderous fire. Soon several British ships pressed close to the Batavian flotilla but were successfully repelled. They were unable, therefore, to prevent the squadron from continuing its course towards Griz Nez. In order to approach the extreme corner of this cape, it was however necessary for the vessels under Ver Huell's command to move further out to sea, which exposed them to the fire of the British ships, who could now aim their guns at a shorter distance, sometimes within pistol range. In addition, the cape had to be bypassed, a maneuver that brought every ship of the flotilla within range of the fire of the entire enemy force. The low Batavian ships, however, offered little surface area for British artillery while the larger British warships provided a much easier target.

Despite the heavy fire, Ver Huell's contingent reached Griz Nez in good order. The British, however, now united their force and aimed it at a point where every Batavian vessel would have to pass. The entire British squadron, a gunshot away from the cape, took up a position. One section tried to encircle the Batavian vanguard, while another shot at the Batavian flotilla from the side and tried to cut off its path. Despite enemy fire, the first gunboat, on which Ver Huell was standing, sailed around the cape without any problems. Because Ver Huell had ensured that the order of battle of his squadron was very tight, so that it could not be cut off, the British plan failed and the Batavian flotilla reached the coast safely, eventually anchoring between Audresselles and Ambleteuse. After one last British attack on the Batavian gunboats, the French coastal batteries, now in range, managed to dislodge them and force them to head out back to sea. Around 20:00 the battle was over.

Aftermath
With the trip around Cape Griz Nez, another Batavian fleet, of 84 vessels, was also able to make the trip from the port of Dunkirk to Amblateuse unscathed. Ver Huell was showered with praise in France. In the Batavian Republic however, the victory was barely celebrated. Despite this feat, events elsewhere meant that the invasion of Britain was ultimately called off.

Gallery

Notes

References

Sources 
 
 
 

Battles of the War of the Third Coalition
Conflicts in 1805
Military history of the Pas-de-Calais
Naval battles involving the Batavian Republic
Naval battles involving France
Naval battles involving the United Kingdom
Military history of the English Channel
Naval battles of the Napoleonic Wars
Napoleon's planned invasion of the United Kingdom
Gris-Nez and Blanc-Nez